'Creston' is an apple cultivar released by the Pacific Agri-Food Research Centre at Summerland, British Columbia.

Characteristics
'Creston' is a triploid, with poor pollen production and seedlings from it are generally weak. Its fruit are large, self-thinning, resembling 'Jonagold', with good keeping characteristics, flavour, and texture. They are suitable for eating fresh, and for making pies and applesauce.

References 

Apple cultivars